Paravelleda is a genus of longhorn beetles of the subfamily Lamiinae, containing the following species:

 Paravelleda aberrans (Duvivier, 1891)
 Paravelleda bispinosa (Aurivillius, 1910)
 Paravelleda dentata (Hintz, 1911)
 Paravelleda gedeensis Adlbauer, 2010
 Paravelleda grisescens Breuning, 1949
 Paravelleda kenyensis Breuning, 1936
 Paravelleda nyassana Breuning, 1936
 Paravelleda orientalis Breuning, 1956
 Paravelleda pulchra Breuning, 1938

References

Phrissomini